The Royal (Dick) School of Veterinary Studies, commonly referred to as the Dick Vet, is the veterinary school of the University of Edinburgh in Scotland and part of the College of Medicine and Veterinary Medicine the head of which is Moira Whyte. David Argyle has been Dean and Head of School since 1 November 2011.

The school was ranked last in the UK by the UK Government in the 2014 Research Excellence Framework and the 2008 Research Assessment Exercise (RAE). The School was ranked second in the world in the ShanghaiRanking's Global Ranking of Academic Subjects 2020 – Veterinary Sciences, 3rd in the world by the QS World University Rankings for Veterinary Science in 2021, first in the UK for the fourth year running by The Guardian University Guide 2021, and first in the UK for the fifth year running by the Times and Sunday Times Good University Guide ranking for Veterinary Medicine.

History
Originally called the Highland Society's Veterinary School, Edinburgh, the Dick Vet, as it came to be known, was established by William Dick, a former student of the anatomist John Barclay of the Royal College of Surgeons of Edinburgh. The first regular classes at the school were begun in November 1823, although lectures to small groups of students had been provided for four years prior to this date. That first session of regular classes was financed by student fees and a grant from the Highland Society of Scotland at Edinburgh, of which John Barclay was a director. Mary Dick, William's elder sister, was reputed to have been instrumental, from the early days, in the administration of the school.

Although an autonomous institution, the students also attended the lectures in (human) medicine at the University of Edinburgh and the Royal College of Surgeons of Edinburgh.

Clyde Street
In 1833, William Dick, who was by then a successful veterinary practitioner and teacher, paid for construction of purpose-built accommodation near the site of his father's forge in a Clyde Street courtyard. William lived adjacent at 15 Clyde Street. (Today Multrees Walk is approximately where Clyde Street was.) This was the base for the school until it moved to its next site at Summerhall in 1916. In 1839, his school officially became a college and William Dick was given the title professor. By the time of Dick's death in 1866, the over 2000 students he had taught were to be found throughout the world. Among them were the founders of veterinary schools in Australia, Canada, Ireland and the United States. On his death, Dick bequeathed his college in trust to the Burgh Council of Edinburgh.

It was officially named Dick’s Veterinary College following a request made by his sister, in 1873, in response to a crisis caused by the establishment of the rival New Veterinary College set up by alumnus and former Principal William Williams. Williams had taken with him the majority of the students, and the library. The two schools existed amicably within 100 m of one another in Edinburgh's New Town until 1904, when the Williams' school moved to Liverpool, England, forming the basis of the University of Liverpool Faculty of Veterinary Science. The Royal (Dick) Veterinary College was incorporated by Act of Parliament in 1906.

Summerhall

Orlando Charnock Bradley was principal of the Dick Vet when it moved in 1916 to the south side of Edinburgh, to another purpose-designed building, at Summerhall.

On 10 May 1951 the college was reconstituted as The Royal (Dick) School of Veterinary Studies, and officially became part of the University of Edinburgh, and became a full Faculty of Veterinary Medicine in 1964. Reorganisation of the university in 2002 resulted in the abolishment of Faculties, and the Dick Vet once again became The Royal (Dick) School of Veterinary Studies, one of the four Schools within the College of Medicine and Veterinary Medicine.

In 2009, Scottish Television filmed a five-part documentary at the Royal (Dick) School of Veterinary Studies. Some of the cases shown on the documentary follow a wild swan needing an endoscopy, a horse in emergency colic surgery, a skunk being neutered, a chameleon with an eye infection, and the removal of a tumour near a cat's heart. STV filmed a second documentary in 2010.

Since 2013, Summerhall is now a major international art museum and arts hub which has exhibited over 200 artists in two years as well as many theatre, music and literature events in the building.

Easter Bush Veterinary Campus
For the first time since 1962, all the veterinary facilities, together with the Roslin Institute, were consolidated onto one campus.

The Easter Bush Veterinary Campus 
The Easter Bush Veterinary Campus is one of four campuses owned and operated by the University of Edinburgh and is approximately 7 miles south of Edinburgh city centre. The campus sits south of the Pentland Hills and can be accessed from the A702 and A703.

The faculty's undergraduate degree in Veterinary Medicine (BVM&S) is accredited by the Royal College of Veterinary Surgeons in the UK, by the American Veterinary Medical Association in North America, the  European Association of Establishments for Veterinary Education (EAEVE), The Australasian Veterinary Boards Council (AVBC)] and The South African Veterinary Council.

As well as university buildings, the campus holds the nursery, for children aged 0 to 5.

History of the Easter Bush Campus 
Historically, the site on which the Easter Bush campus sits was agricultural land. The first mention of ‘Bush’ which related to the near-by Bush Estate, and the Category A listed Bush House which lay at its centre, was recorded on maps as early as 1812. Buildings at Bush Home Farm and Easter Bush appeared by 1892.

The University of Edinburgh purchased the Bush and Dryden estates in 1947, allocating the land around the farmstead at Easter Bush to the Veterinary College for livestock practical teaching

In 1962, the university opened a Veterinary Field Station and Centre for Tropical Veterinary Medicine on the land to the south of Home Farm at Easter Bush. These buildings housed clinical teaching facilities, research laboratories and offices as well as lecture theatres, seminar rooms, a refectory and a gym.

The Hospital for Small Animals opened in 1999 and in 2002 the university purchased Langhill Farm, sited just 2 miles from Easter Bush, it provided improved livestock facilities for the 220 strong herd of dairy cows. The land that had previously been occupied by the livestock, was able to be re-developed, and in 2003 the Equine and Large Ruminant Hospitals opened.

In 2005, the University of Edinburgh approved a detailed proposal to relocate all of the Royal (Dick) School of Veterinary Studies teaching activities to a purpose-built new building amongst the schools animal hospitals at Easter Bush and in 2011 the William Dick building and Roslin Institute building opened on campus.

The William Dick Building 
The William Dick Building, was opened for teaching in September 2011 by HRH Princess Royal and sits on the Easter Bush Campus. It contains purpose-built facilities for veterinary teaching, including a clinical skills laboratory, anatomy facilities and two lecture theatres. It holds a canteen which is open to staff, students and the general public.

The Roslin Institute 
The Roslin Institute was integrated into the University of Edinburgh in 2008 and in 2011 the completion of a new purpose-built research building on the Easter Bush Campus, saw it move the majority of its research to the campus.

The Dick Vet Hospital for Small Animals 
The Dick Vet Hospital for Small Animals was opened in 1999 and is the Royal (Dick) School of Veterinary Studies main small animal clinical facility. It offers both first opinion services, through the Dick Vet General Practice, as well as referral services to referring veterinary clinicians. It has a range of specialist services, which include: Anaesthesia, Cardiopulmonary, Dermatology, Diagnostic Imaging, Emergency and Critical Care, The Feline Clinic, Internal Medicine, Interventional Radiology, Neurology and Neurosurgery, Ophthalmology, Orthopaedic Surgery, Soft Tissue Surgery, the Dick Vet Rabbit and Exotic Practice and the Riddell-Swann Veterinary Cancer Centre.

Equine Veterinary Services 
Equine Veterinary Services consists of the Dick Vet Equine Practice, which offers first opinion care to horses, and the Dick Vet Equine Hospital. Within the Dick Vet Equine Hospital are a number of specialist services, including: Medicine, Orthopaedics, Soft Tissue Surgery, Reproduction, Farriery, anaesthesia, Diagnostic Imaging and Behaviour.

The Jeanne Marchig International Centre for Animal Welfare Education 
The Jeanne Marchig International Centre for Animal Welfare Education (JMICAWE) is a hub of expertise on animal welfare education, collaborating with international universities, governments, charities and NGO partners to advance the understanding of animal welfare issues.

Recent projects have included investing in the Clinical Skills Lab at the Dick Vet School, providing students with animal alternatives on which to practice; including a new equine colic simulator. They have also developed a new online Masters programme in International Animal Welfare, Ethics and Law which joins the on-campus Masters in Applied Animal Behaviour and Animal Welfare. These programmes are supported by The Scottish Rural College allowing students to benefit from being taught by many of the best animal welfare experts in the country.

The National Avian Research Facility 
In September 2013, the National Avian Research Facility was opened on the Easter Bush campus in partnership with the Pirbright Institute. NARF's mission is to improve the productivity, health and welfare of poultry through research on host-pathogen interactions, avian genetics, development and physiology using state-of-the-art technologies.

The Charnock Bradley Building 
The Charnock Bradley Building is a hub for the Easter Bush Campus, providing a home for the Roslin Innovation Centre, Easter Bush Science Outreach Centre (EBSOC) and the Easter Bush Gym. Opened in May 2018 by HRH Princess Royal the building contains office and laboratory space. Located in front of the building sits Canter a sculpture by Andy Scot, who is best known for The Kelpies. it was unveiled in May 2018 at the same time as the building opened and the 15 ft steel statue of a horse's head forms the centrepiece of the entrance plaza.

The Roslin Innovation Centre 
The Roslin Innovation Centre provides office and laboratory space for tenant companies, university spin outs and early-stage entrepreneurs. Its laboratories and office spaces have been designed to be subdivided into different configurations, allowing for companies of all sizes to occupy the space. There are 285 laboratory workstations and space for 380 scientists and support staff.

Easter Bush Science Outreach Centre 
The Easter Bush Science Outreach Centre (EBSOC) was opened on 1 May 2018 by HRH Princess Royal. EBSOC is a purpose-built teaching laboratory, which offers interactive curriculum linked learning experiences for school pupils and community groups. It is supported by scientists from across the Easter Bush Campus, who discuss their current research with the children, to help relate their learning to real life scientific research. The centre is managed by Dr Nicola Stock and staffed by a dedicated team, who design the activities.

Notable alumni

Joseph Henry Carter (1857-1930), President of the Royal College of Veterinary Surgeons in 1920
Min Chueh Chang (1908-1991), clinical fellow in agricultural science, co-inventor of the combined oral contraceptive pill and winner of the Albert Lasker Award
Robin Coombs, (1921–2006, grad. 1943), who devised the ′Coombs test′, a critical diagnostic test for use in haematology and blood transfusion
John Boyd Dunlop, (1840–1921, grad. 1859?60), inventor of the first practical pneumatic tyre, and founder of Dunlop Rubber Company
Sir Frederick Fitzwygram, (1823–1904), president of the RCVS (1875–77) and as such unified the veterinary profession
George Fleming (1833–1901, grad. 1855), founder of the Veterinary Journal in 1875, architect of the 1881 Vet Surgeons Act
James Law, the first professor of veterinary medicine in the United States (Cornell)
James McCall, established the Glasgow Veterinary College in 1862
Duncan McNab McEachran, (1841–1924, grad. 1861), co-founder of the Upper Canada Veterinary School in 1863, founder of the Montreal Vet College in 1866,
Albert E. Mettam, (1866–1917) first principal of Royal Vet College, Dublin
Prof William Christopher Miller FRSE Professor of Animal Husbandry at the Royal Veterinary College, London
Hamish Moore, (grad. 1975), maker, musician and teacher of Scottish Bagpipes, especially the Scottish Smallpipes.
Jotello Festiri Soga, (grad. 1886), first South African veterinary surgeon,
Donald Sinclair, (1911–1995, grad. 1933), portrayed as Siegfried Farnon in Alf Wight's (James Herriot) novels
Brian Sinclair, (1915–1988, grad. 1943), the brother to Siegfried Farnon in Alf Wight's (James Herriot) novels, portrayed as Tristan Farnon
Andrew Smith, founder of the Ontario Veterinary College, Canada, the oldest veterinary college in the Americas
Alasdair Steele-Bodger CBE FRCVS (1924 – 2008),  Professor of Veterinary Clinical Studies at the University of Cambridge, son of Harry Steele-Bodger
Harry Steele-Bodger (1896–1952, grad. 1922), president of the British Veterinary Association
Sir Stewart Stockman, built first UK research laboratories (Weybridge), president of the RCVS (1923–24)
Noah M. Wekesa, (1936 - ), Minister for Science and Technology in the Kenyan Government
William Williams, (1832–1900), the Welsh veterinary surgeon who founded of the New Veterinary College in Edinburgh in 1873 (which went on to become the Faculty of Veterinary Science of the University of Liverpool) and author of several standard works on veterinary science
Henry Felix Clement Hebeler CBE, (1917–1989), president of the British Veterinary Association (1958–59)

Notable staff
 Prof Robert Stewart MacDougall FRSE LLD (1862-1947)
 Prof William McGregor Mitchell FRSE (1888-1970)
Prof David Frederick Cottrell (1947-2009)

Principals/Deans
From amalgamation with Edinburgh University in 1951 the role became first director then dean of faculty rather than principal of the college.

William Dick (veterinarian) from 1823 to 1866
Col James Hallen 1866/67
William Williams (veterinarian) from 1867 to 1873
Thomas Walley from 1874 to 1894
John R. U. Dewar from 1895 to 1911
Orlando Charnock Bradley from 1911 to 1937
Robert G. Linton (acting 1938/39)
Sir Arthur Olver from 1939 to 1945
Donald C. Matheson (acting 1946)
William McGregor Mitchell from 1947 to 1951 as Principal and 1951 to 1958 as Director of Vet Education
Alexander Robertson (veterinarian) from 1958 to 1964 as Director and 1964 to 1970 as Dean
Frank Alexander Dean 1970 to 1974
Ainsley Iggo 1974 to 1977
Ian Stuart Beattie from 1977 to 1980
Keith Dyce from 1980 to 1984
James T. Baxter 1984/85
Ainsley Iggo (second term) 1985 to 1990
Richard Halliwell (veterinarian) from 1990 to 1994
Morley Sewell from 1994 to 1997
Hugh R. P. Miller from 1997 to 2001
Richard Halliwell (veterinarian) (second term) 2001/2
Hugh R. P. Miller (second term) 2002/3
Elaine Watson from 2003 to 2011
David Argyle from 2011

References

External links
Official website
"Royal support for £40m investment at veterinary college", The Herald, 13 June 2006

Educational institutions established in 1823
Veterinary schools in Scotland
1823 establishments in Scotland
Schools of the University of Edinburgh